

Carter Bar is a pass in the Cheviot Hills, on the Anglo-Scottish border. It lies east of Carter Fell at the head of Redesdale, and is crossed by the A68 road as it runs north towards Teviotdale.

The name "Carter Bar" is relatively modern, and refers to a toll-gate that once stood here. Historically, Carter Bar was known as the Redeswire, from the Scots word swire meaning "col" or "pass". The Redeswire Fray, fought here in 1575, was the last significant battle between England and Scotland.

History
Carter Bar was the location of the "truce days", at which the wardens of the English and Scottish marches would meet to dispense cross-border justice. Truce days were also held at Carlisle and Berwick-upon-Tweed.

In 1575, Carter Bar was the scene of the Raid of the Redeswire, one of the last large-scale battles between the English and the Scots.

In the 19th century a toll road was constructed from Carter Bar to the market town of Hawick, necessitating the building of the Bonchester Bridge over Rule Water.

Tourism
Carter Bar forms a popular point for tourists to stop and take photographs on the Anglo-Scottish border. There are two marker stones on either side of the A68 for this purpose, the original stone created by local Borders stonemason, Eddie Laub. Upper Redesdale, the Scottish Borders (including Tweeddale), and the Cheviot Hills are all visible from Carter Bar. However, its altitude means snow is possible even in late spring and early autumn, and the Carter Bar pass can be subject to frequent snow-related closures during the winter.

See also
 List of places in the Scottish Borders
 List of places in Northumberland

External links
 RCAHMS: Martinlee Sike
 Scottish Borders Council: Carter Bar / Homecoming 2009
 Scottish Borders Council, windfarm proposal

References 

Anglo-Scottish border
Mountain passes of England
Mountain passes of Scotland
Cheviot Hills
Rochester, Northumberland